Sven Gustaf Alvar Höglund (23 October 1910 – 21 August 1995) was a Swedish cyclist who competed in the 1932 Summer Olympics. He finished eighth in the individual road race and won a bronze medal with the Swedish team. He won the team road race at the Swedish championships of 1935 and 1936 and at the 1933 Nordic Championship, where he finished second individually.

References 

1910 births
1995 deaths
Swedish male cyclists
Olympic cyclists of Sweden
Cyclists at the 1932 Summer Olympics
Olympic bronze medalists for Sweden
Olympic medalists in cycling
People from Tierp Municipality
Medalists at the 1932 Summer Olympics
Sportspeople from Uppsala County
20th-century Swedish people